The Darkest Sword, also known as Hei jian gui jing tian, is a 1970 Hong Kong action martial arts film directed by Lung Chien, produced by Yuan Hsiang Wu, and starring Ching-Ching Chang and Pin Chiang.

Plot 

Tun-Shan is grieved because he unintentionally killed an enemy and doesn't want to fight anymore. Then, he destroys his sword. Meanwhile, Su-Chen, in love with him, convinces him to start fighting again.

Cast

 Ching-Ching Chang		
 Pin Chiang
 Yuan Yi	
 Ming-Ming Hsiao
 Min-Hsiung Wu

References

External links

1970 films
1970 martial arts films
1970s action films
1970s martial arts films
1970s Cantonese-language films
Films shot in Hong Kong
Hong Kong action films
Hong Kong films about revenge
Hong Kong martial arts films
Kung fu films
1970s Mandarin-language films
Films directed by Lung Chien
1970s Hong Kong films